The Alma River is in Marlborough, New Zealand.  It flows through rugged inland terrain before meeting the Severn River not far from where the Severn meets the Acheron River.

Rivers of the Marlborough Region
Rivers of New Zealand